Círculo Popular de La Felguera was a Spanish football club based in La Felguera, Asturias. Founded in 1917, it held home matches at Estadio La Barraca, with a 5,000 (1,000-seat) capacity.

History
Círculo Popular de La Felguera was founded in 1916, in the 1950s was named La Felguera Siderúrgica C.P., in 1961 was founded UP Langreo by the merger between Círculo Popular and Racing de Sama

Seasons

5 seasons in Segunda División
13 seasons in Tercera División

Defunct football clubs in Asturias
UP Langreo
Association football clubs established in 1917
Association football clubs disestablished in 1961
CP La Felguera
CP La Felguera
Segunda División clubs